Guilherme "Gui" Brandao (born March 7, 1988) is a Brazilian footballer.

Career

College & Amateur
Between 2010 and 2013, Gui played four years of college soccer; three years at Belhaven University and one year at Jacksonville University.

While at college, Gui also appeared for USL PDL club Baton Rouge Capitals in 2011 and Mississippi Brilla in 2012.

Professional career
Gui signed with USL Pro club Charlotte Eagles on March 24, 2013.

References

1988 births
Living people
Brazilian footballers
Brazilian expatriate footballers
Jacksonville Dolphins men's soccer players
Baton Rouge Capitals players
Mississippi Brilla players
Charlotte Eagles players
Association football midfielders
Expatriate soccer players in the United States
USL League Two players
USL Championship players